The Morocco A' national football team is the local national football team of Morocco and is open only to domestic league players. It is the only team to win the African Nations Championship twice in a row in 2018 and 2021.

The primary men's Morocco national football team contains expatriate players and represents Morocco at the Africa Cup of Nations.

History
The Local Atlas Lions were eliminated in the qualifiers for the first two editions of the African Nations Championship (CHAN) in 2009 and 2011, before qualifying for the first time to the CHAN in the 2014 edition, which was hosted in South Africa instead of Libya, who were initially supposed to organize the only continental national competition for local players.

During their first participation in the competition, the Moroccans, led by coach Hassan Benaabicha (who, in replacement of Rachid Taoussi, was asked to manage the team just a few days before the start of the final tournament), did not make it past the second round. Rachid Taoussi had been behind the qualification of the Moroccans to the competition, but did not have the chance to go further than that, as he was replaced by Benaabicha, who had done well in various regional and international competitions at the time with other lower categories Moroccan national teams.

The first two matches for the Moroccans in the tournament were 0–0 and 1–1 draws against Zimbabwe and Burkina Faso, respectively. It was only after the third match that the Local Atlas Lions could ensure qualification to the second round, after beating Uganda 3–1. In the quarter-finals, Morocco were beaten surprisingly by Nigeria 3–4, after leading 3–0 in the first half.

In 2016, it was another Moroccan coach, with the famous name of Mohamed “El General” Fakhir, who led the Moroccans to qualification for the second consecutive time at the CHAN, which was organized in Rwanda. However, this was even worse than their previous tournament run, with the Atlas Lions eliminated in the first round after finishing third in their group.

The team's final match, an astonishing 4–1 win against host country Rwanda, could not prevent the Moroccans' elimination; they had already suffered a scoreless draw against Gabon and a 0–1 defeat against the Ivory Coast in their first two matches.

However, Moroccan fans could enjoy not only the hosting of the CHAN in the kingdom two years later in 2018, but also a tournament victory for their local national team, which became the third North African country to win the competition’s title, after Tunisia, winners in 2011, and Libya in 2014.

The road was not easy for Moroccan players, who were coached by Jamal Sellami in 2018, as they had to face strong, experienced African National teams, especially in the semi-final and final matches.

In the group phase, the path was easier, with a 4–0 victory against Mauritania followed by a second 3–1 win against Guinea, before a scoreless draw against Sudan in the final group match. The Local Atlas Lions finished top of their group with 7 points out of 9 to advance to the quarter-finals, where they beat Namibia 2–0 in Casablanca.

On 31 January 2018, Al Mountakhab made history, as they qualified for the final match of the CHAN for the first time in their history after beating 2014 title winners Libya 3–1 at the Mohamed V stadium in Casablanca.

The final match was a flurry of Moroccan goals. Four in total were scored, by Zakaria Hadraf in both the 44th and 61st minutes, Walid El Karti in the 64th minute, as well as Ayoub El Kaabi (top scorer of the competition) in the 73rd minute, to win a first CHAN title for the kingdom.

In February 2021, Morocco won their second title after a 2–0 win over Mali in the final in Cameroon.

African Nations Championship record

Recent results and forthcoming fixtures

2021

2022

Current team status

2020 African Nations Championship

Group C

Quarter-finals

Semi-finals

Final

Honours and awards

Honours 
African Nations Championship (2)
  Champions: 2018, 2020 

Arab Cup (1)
  Champions: 2012
  Third place: 2002

Awards 
African Nations Championship Top scorer

 2018: Ayoub El Kaabi
 2020: Soufiane Rahimi

African Nations Championship Best player

 2018: Ayoub El Kaabi
 2020: Soufiane Rahimi

African Nations Championship Best goalkeeper

 2020: Anas Zniti

Squad
The following players were called up for the  2020 African Nations Championship in Cameroon.

Caps and goals only in the current competition, as of 7 February 2021 after the match against Mali.

Manager:  Hussein Ammouta

Previous squads 

 African Nations Championship squads
 CHAN 2014 squad
 CHAN 2016 squad
 CHAN 2018 squad
 CHAN 2020 squad

 FIFA Arab Cup squads
 FAC 2021 squad

References

Morocco national football team
Morocco